Wednesday Night Rivalry and Wednesday Night Hockey was the branding used for National Hockey League games that aired on NBCSN on Wednesday nights during the regular season from January 2013 to May 2021.

In the 2012–13 NHL season, NBCSN rebranded their coverage of Wednesday night games as Wednesday Night Rivalry. It primarily featured rivalry games, although the network has received criticism for games which do not seem to include a strong element of rivalry (such as Los Angeles-Detroit, Pittsburgh-Buffalo, and Chicago-Philadelphia) are common. NBCSN sometimes produces a Wednesday Nightcap game primarily featuring Western Conference teams immediately following their Wednesday Night Rivalry game. Beginning in the 2013–14 NHL season, NBCSN aired the series NHL Rivals, which looks back at the participating teams' historic rivalry, leading up to their Wednesday Night Rivalry game. That same season, NBCSN promoted the games with the slogan "The Night You Love To Hate".

Beginning with the 2018–19 NHL season, NBC Sports rebranded its Wednesday night broadcasts of the NHL as Wednesday Night Hockey, with the focus shifting from rivalry games to powerhouse teams and top NHL stars. The first season of Wednesday Night Hockey featured more West Coast games and a few matchups featuring Canadian teams.

Results

2012–13 season

2013–14 season

2014–15 season
TSN's Bob McKenzie and Darren Dreger begin to make appearances on Wednesday Night Rivalry as NHL insiders every pregame and first intermission.

2015–16 season

2016–17 season

2017–18 season

2018–19 season (as Wednesday Night Hockey)
As part of the new Wednesday Night Hockey format, "Inside the Glass" reporter Pierre McGuire is now assigned to work the late game of Wednesday Night Hockey doubleheaders while Brian Boucher takes over "Inside the Glass" reporting duties for the early game alongside Mike Emrick and Eddie Olczyk. McGuire joins the lead team of Emrick and Olczyk only during single-header Wednesday Night Hockey games. In addition, Kathryn Tappen replaced Liam McHugh as the studio host for the first half of the season when the latter was promoted to work postgame coverage of Sunday Night Football. The Toronto-Winnipeg game on October 24 marked the first-ever regular-season NHL on NBC broadcast to feature only Canadian teams and an NBC-produced broadcast (as opposed to a simulcast of a Canadian network).

On February 20, Mike Tirico made his NHL announcing debut calling the Blackhawks–Red Wings game with Olczyk and Boucher.

2019–20 season (as Wednesday Night Hockey)
For this season only, Mike Emrick, Eddie Olczyk, and "Inside the Glass" reporter Brian Boucher will call the Wednesday Night Hockey match-up. Pierre McGuire will appear on other broadcasts. In addition, Kathryn Tappen replaced Liam McHugh as the studio host for the first half of the season when the latter was promoted to work postgame coverage of Sunday Night Football.

Due to the coronavirus pandemic, the NHL regular season ended on March 12.

2020–21 season (as Wednesday Night Hockey)
Due to the COVID-19 pandemic, the start of the 2020–21 NHL season has been delayed to January 13, 2021, and all teams played a 56-game division-only schedule with the NHL temporarily realigning divisions to minimize travel as much as possible, with all seven Canadian teams playing one division due to COVID-19 cross-border travel restrictions imposed by the Government of Canada.

NBCSN opened the season with a season-opening triple header on January 13, 2021 as part of Wednesday Night Hockey. 19 different teams featured in 19 Wednesday Night Hockey matchups which will include a blend of Eastern, Western, and Canadian markets. Star players such as Connor McDavid, Auston Matthews, Alex Ovechkin, Sidney Crosby, Patrick Kane, Carey Price, David Pastrnak, Claude Giroux, and the #1 overall pick in the 2020 NHL Entry Draft, Alexis Lafreniere will be featured in Wednesday Night Hockey. 14 out of the 19 Wednesday Night Hockey matchups will feature a team that made the 2020 Stanley Cup playoffs. However, not all games will be exclusive, unlike in previous seasons.

NBC did not name a presumptive lead play-by-play voice following the retirement of Mike Emrick and chose to rotate between John Forslund and Kenny Albert. Eventually, Mike Tirico was added to the rotation starting with the Bruins-Flyers game on February 3.

This was the final season of NBC broadcasting NHL games before the league's new American national television contracts with ESPN/ABC and TNT beginning with the 2021–22 season. TNT has largely maintained Wednesday night as the primary night for its coverage.

Ratings
Wednesday Night Rivalry has produced successful viewership for NBCSN.

During its inaugural season, Wednesday Night Rivalry was called "the hottest new brand in sports" by Forbes. It claimed six of the top eight most-watched NHL regular-season telecasts ever on NBC Sports Network and averaged 646,000 viewers. With the success of Wednesday Night Rivalry, the 2012–13 NHL season was the most watched NHL season on cable in 19 years.

During the 2013–14 NHL season, Wednesday Night Rivalry averaged 559,000 viewers, up 26% from its average viewership of Wednesday night games during the 2011–12 NHL season (443,000). The first two seasons of Wednesday Night Rivalry has recorded none games with more than 700,000 viewers as compared to four during the two seasons prior to the introduction of Wednesday Night Rivalry.

During the 2014–15 NHL season, NBCSN's Wednesday Night Rivalry coverage averaged 565,000 viewers. NBCSN's opening night coverage of Bruins-Flyers had an opening-night cable record 956,000 viewers. Seven of the 10 most-watched NHL games on NBCSN were Wednesday Night Rivalry games.

During the 2015–16 NHL season, Wednesday Night Rivalry averaged 608,000 viewers and produced three of the 10 most-watched NHL regular-season games on NBCSN during their time as the NHL pay television carrier. NBCSN's 10-most watched games of the 2015–16 season were either Wednesday Night Rivalry or Sunday Night Hockey games.

Notes

References

2013 American television series debuts
2021 American television series endings
2010s American television series
2020s American television series
NHL on NBC
NBC
NBCSN shows